Chapter House Street is a street in the city centre of York, England, connecting Ogleforth and Minster Yard.

History
The street follows the route of the via decumana of Roman Eboracum.  It is believed to have been the main route into York from the north-east until about 1330, when Monk Bar was constructed and the access through the York city walls stopped up.  The road was then regarded as part of Ogleforth.  It lay within the walls of the Minster Close, constructed in the 13th century.

The parsonage of St John-del-Pyke lay on the street, and after that church closed, in 1553, it became used by the incumbents of Holy Trinity, Goodramgate.  The road was widened in 1825, and in 1838 the name "Chapter House Street" was first recorded.

The Royal Commission on Historic Monuments described the street as "a short cobbled lane, bounded by the walls and entrance of the Treasurer's House and small houses, and terminated visually by the Minster choir and chapter house".

Layout and architecture

The street runs north-east, from the junction of Minster Yard and Minster Court, until it turns sharply south-east to become Ogleforth.  On its north-western side lie the side entrance of Treasurer's House, a National Trust property; 4 and 6 Chapter House Street, both built about 1820; Grays Court, a grade I listed hotel with 12th-century origins; and 8 Chapter House Street, with Mediaeval origins but largely rebuilt in the 1730s.  On the south-eastern side are the 15th-century 1 Chapter House Street; Mediaeval 3 Chapter House Street; and the 16th-century 5 Chapter House Street, part of a building mostly on Ogleforth.

References

Streets in York